Lophocampa amaxiaeformis is a moth of the family Erebidae. It was described by Walter Rothschild in 1910. It is found in Panama and Ecuador.

Description

Male

Head and thorax yellow and reddish brown, abdomen pale yellow. Forewing pale yellow with brownish-red tinge and spots. Hindwing pale yellow.
Wingspan 34 mm.

References

 

amaxiaeformis
Moths described in 1910
Arctiinae of South America